The ninth generation of the Ford F-Series is a lineup of trucks that were produced by Ford from the 1992 to 1998 model years. The final generation of the F-Series to include a complete range of trucks from a half-ton F-150 pickup truck to a medium-duty F-800 commercial truck, this is the third generation of the F-Series body and chassis introduced for 1980.  

To improve the aerodynamics of the exterior, the front fascia underwent a substantial revision to its design.  The Flareside bed design made its return, following a substantial change in its design.       

In 1996, the tenth-generation F-Series was released (including the F-150) for the 1997 model year.  The ninth-generation F-250 and F-350 remained in production through the 1997 and 1998 model years, respectively.  For 1999, the heavier-duty model lines were replaced by Ford Super Duty trucks, a brand also adopted for Ford medium-duty trucks.

Design history
 

In the interest of aerodynamics, the lines of the hood, front fenders, and grille were rounded off for 1992. Along with the larger grille, the headlights were enlarged (with the turn signals again moving below). Inside, the interior was updated with a redesigned dashboard along with new seats. Extended-cab (SuperCab) models received larger rear side windows. A notable change included the reintroduction of the Flareside bed that returned for production since 1987. Instead of the previous classic-style bed, the Flareside bed was now a narrow-body version of the dual rear-wheel bed; the rear fenders were repositioned to fit the width of the cab. Also, unlike with the classic Flareside bed, dual gas tanks were available with it, but only for 2-wheel-drive models. There are also F-150 badges being replaced by special Flareside badging as seen on the front fenders.

The 1994 models brought a slightly updated dashboard and the addition of a standard driver's-side airbag on F-150s and light-duty F-250s only, center high mount stop lamp (CHMSL), brake-shift interlock, and CFC-free air conditioning. New options for 1994 included remote keyless entry with alarm, a compact disc player fitted into the regular stereo system, and a power driver's seat; an electrochromic inside rear view mirror was also offered for 1994 and 1995 as part of a luxury light package.

Ford trailed their rival General Motors in combined truck sales for much of the ninth generation, though sales steadily rose each year. 500,000 F-Series trucks were sold in 1992, but this rose to nearly 800,000 by 1996, allowing Ford to overtake combined sales of Chevrolet and GMC trucks for the first time in a decade.

Trim
Custom (1992–1993) Included: Cargo box light, tinted glass, argent grille, steel wheels with hubcaps, color-keyed floormats, an AM radio with digital clock and two speakers, vinyl bench seat, and voltmeter, oil pressure and temperature gauges. 
XL (1992-1997): Added: argent steel wheels, air conditioning, a cloth bench seat, and a rear bench on the SuperCab only.
XLT (1992-1997): Added: Black rub strip, chrome grille, deep-dish aluminum wheels, carpeted map pockets, an AM/FM stereo with digital clock and two speakers, and a cloth and vinyl bench seat.  
Nite (1990-1992): Added: cloth flight bench with power lumbar, sliding rear window, aluminum deep dish wheels.
SVT Lightning (1993–1995) Added (from XLT trim): 5-spoke aluminum rims, an AM/FM stereo with cassette player, digital clock and four speakers, power windows and locks, and air conditioning.
Eddie Bauer (1995–1996, F-150, only)
4x4 Offroad (1992-1997)

The monochromatic "Nite" package introduced in 1990 continued but was dropped at the end of the 1992 model year.  As before, it featured an all-black exterior with either a pink or blue/purple stripe and "Nite" decal on the sides of the cargo box.

For 1993, the Custom model was dropped, as the XL became the new base model. Following the lead of the Aerostar, Bronco, and Explorer, the Eddie Bauer trim line — featuring plusher trim and increased standard features — was reintroduced for 1995. Also in 1993, the SVT Lightning was introduced, slotting itself in between the Chevrolet 454SS and GMC Syclone. Ford Special Vehicles Team upgraded the Lightning from the regular F-series with heavy-duty suspension and brakes.  Powertrain upgrades came from heavy-duty trucks, with a 240 hp version of the 5.8L V8 and the E4OD overdrive transmission normally paired with the 7.3L diesel and 460 7.5L V8 options.

The F-150 4x4 continued the use of the Dana 44 Twin-Traction Beam axle from the 80–91 trucks, and the Ford 8.8" Rear Straight axle. The F-250 4x4 carried the Dana 50 Twin Traction Beam axle, the Sterling 10.25 from the previous generation for the rear; full float on heavy duty 3/4-ton trucks and the 4wd F350 used the Dana 60 Straight Axle front, and the Sterling 10.25" rear Straight axle.

Models
Ninth-generation Ford F-Series models are:
 F-150: 1/2 ton (6,250 lb GVWR max)
 F-250: 1992–1995 3/4 ton (8,800 lb GVWR max)
 F-250: 1996-1997 1/2 ton (6,250 lb GVWR max)
 F-250 HD: 1996–1997 3/4 ton (8,800 GVWR max)
 F-350: 1 ton (10,000 lb GVWR max)
 F-Super Duty (chassis cab model only): 1 1/2 ton and greater (16,000 lb GVWR max)

The F-150, F-250, F-250 HD, F-350, and F-Super Duty were available in many different configurations from chassis cab base models, up to XLT trimmed models with their chrome and plush seating. The trucks came with a variety of gas and diesel engines. The F-150 could be had with one of 3 gas engines, the 4.9L (300 cid) I6, the 5.0L (302 cid) V8, and the 5.8L (351 cid) V8. The same gas engine options were also available for the heavy-duty trucks along with the 7.5L (460 cid), or you could opt for the 7.3L (444 cid) diesel. 

The first version was the 7.3L IDI (Indirect Injected) V8 (1992 - 1993.5), which was produced by International Trucks. In 1993.5-1994.5 a turbocharged 7.3L IDI V8 with stronger internals was offered as emissions, power, and torque demands were increasing. In the second half of 1994, the new Direct Injected 7.3L Power Stroke V8 Turbodiesel replaced the 7.3L IDI V8. Built by Navistar, and used in Navistar International, known as the T444 E Engine. 

The F-250 HD was available from 1996 to 1997 and differed from the earlier F-250 only slightly. It had “Heavy Duty” printed on the F-250 badges, had slightly different moldings, used the F-350 4407 transfer case, and was available in different cab/bed configurations from earlier F-250 trucks. The term “Heavy Duty” was not in fact to do with an upgrade in the trucks abilities but was to differentiate it from the F-250 light duty truck, which was simply a 7-lug F-150 tenth generation. It had no relation(s) to the heavier Ford F-250, or the newer 1999 "Super Duty". 

As part of the 4x4 off-road package, they were available with several skid plates underneath. After 1997, the heavier-duty models were split from the Ford F-150. These lines of trucks were called the 1999 Ford Super Duty. Because of these changes in design, service technicians started to refer to the first Power Strokes as an OBS or Old Body Style to avoid confusion from the similar Super Duty 7.3 Power Stroke parts. The F-150 could be had with either short (6.5') or long (8') beds with either regular or extended cab. The F-250 and F-350 trucks were only available with long beds (8 ft.) except in 1996 and 1997, the F-250 HD could be had in an extended cab/short bed or crew cab/short bed model. The crew cab short bed and extended cab short bed trucks are very rare, as they were only produced for a little over a year. Despite the OBS (ninth generation) officially ending production in 1997, models were still produced until March of 1998. These trucks had been planned out prior to the end of 1997 and are still titled as 1997 trucks, yet the manufacturing date on some trucks reads as late as 3/98.

It also should be noted that on some F-250 single cab trucks, the front axle is not in fact the Dana 50 Twin Traction Beam, but the even lighter Dana 44 Twin Traction Beam found on the F150 and Bronco. These trucks are distinguished by their significantly smaller locking hubs.

Variants

Medium-duty F-Series

As a running change during the 1994 model year, Ford revised the exterior of its medium-duty (F-600 through F-800) trucks for the first time since their 1980 redesign.  A tilting-cowl hood was made standard with a redesigned hood and grille; turn signals were relocated besides the headlamps.  The cowl badging was revised, with a singular "F-Series" badge replacing the previous stamped model designation.  

In contrast to F-Series pickup trucks, medium-duty trucks saw few changes to the interior; the dashboard controls and steering column were retained from 1980.   

While medium-duty trucks were still offered with a 7.0L gasoline V8 (a 6.1L V8 was discontinued after 1991), the model line was primarily powered by diesel-fueled engines.  Instead of the Navistar T444E V8 engine used by the F-250/F-350, the medium-duty trucks used inline-6 diesels (the Caterpillar 3126 and the Cummins 6BT/ISB). 

For 1999, the F-600 through F-800 were discontinued alongside the derivative B-Series bus chassis.  While the latter has not been replaced, Ford reentered the medium-duty truck segment for 2000 with the Ford F-650/F-750 Super Duty, developed as part of a joint venture with Navistar.

SVT Lightning
The SVT Lightning is a sports/performance version of the F-150, designed by Ford's Truck Division and released by Ford's SVT (Special Vehicle Team) division.

Ford introduced the Lightning in 1992 to compete with primarily the Chevrolet 454 SS, in an effort to enhance the sporty, personal-use image of the Ford F-Series pickup. This initial Lightning featured performance handling developed by world-champion driver Jackie Stewart. The Lightning was powered by a special  version of the  V8 engine. The Lightning shared its basic platform structure with the regular F-150, but modifications were made to many vehicle systems. The engine was based on an existing block, but Ford engineers fitted it with high flow rate "GT40" intake and heads. Like all factory 351s, the Lightning's engine was equipped with hypereutectic pistons to increase response, output and durability. The engine was also fitted with stainless steel "shorty" headers.

The Ford E4OD automatic transmission was the only available transmission. An aluminum driveshaft connected the transmission to 4.10:1 gear in the limited-slip differential.  The suspension had custom-calibrated shocks, front and rear anti-roll bars, and a special leaf in the rear, tipped with a rubber snubber, that acted as a traction bar and controlled rear wheel hop during hard acceleration.  To enhance the Lightning chassis, the thicker frame rails from the 4-wheel drive F-250 were used to increase rigidity.  Additional gusseting was added to the frame at high-stress locations, such as immediately behind the front suspension and over the rear axle. Stock, the Lightning was capable of achieving 0.88 g lateral acceleration, while it retained almost all of the hauling and trailer-towing capabilities of the normal short-wheelbase F-150. Special 17" aluminum wheels with Firestone Firehawk tires, unique Lightning badging, a front air dam with fog lamps and color-matched bumpers from the Bronco, a 120-mph gauge, and blacked-out trim all differentiated the Lightning from normal F-150s. Bucket seats with electrically adjustable side bolsters and lumbar supports were part of the package. Suspension modifications provided a 1 in front and 2.5 in rear drop in ride height.

The 1993 Lightning, launched on 15 December 1992 by Ford President Ed Hagenlocker, received more than 150 favorable articles in America's newspapers, magazines, and television outlets, and helped Ford retain leadership in the personal-use truck market. Three-time World Champion driver Jackie Stewart was highly involved in fine-tuning of the Lightning's handling.

Powertrain
The 1992 redesign retained the powertrain lineup from the previous generation; the lineup of the 4.9 L inline-6, 5.0 L and 5.8 L Windsor V8s, the 7.5 L big-block V8, and the 7.3 L International IDI diesel V8 were all carried over. The diesel gained a turbocharger in mid-1993. The 1994 model year engine lineup was re-tuned to increase output. Later that year, the IDI diesel V8 was replaced by the T444E V8. Dubbed the Power Stroke by Ford, the new diesel was again supplied by Navistar International. Despite sharing identical displacement with its IDI predecessor, the turbocharged Power Stroke/T444E was an all-new design with direct fuel injection. This was the second diesel motor with electronic fuel injection to be put into a light duty truck. The GM 6.5 L Turbo Diesel with the Stanadyne DS-4 injection pump was the first, appearing in 1992. The Dodge Ram did not offer EFI in its diesel engines until 1998. 

As before, the 5.0 L V8 was not offered in trucks over 8500 lbs GVWR, and the F-Super Duty was available with the 7.5 and diesel only. Below 8500 lbs GVWR, the 7.5 and diesel were not available. The 4.9 was available in the F350 through 1996 as a delete option. The ninth generation was the last to offer the venerable pushrod 5.0 L engine.

References

9th generation
Pickup trucks
Rear-wheel-drive vehicles
All-wheel-drive vehicles
Flexible-fuel vehicles
Motor vehicles manufactured in the United States
Cars introduced in 1991